Thelymitra carnea, commonly called the tiny sun orchid or pinkish sun orchid, is a species of orchid that is native to Australia and New Zealand. It has narrow, almost cylindrical leaves and up to four relatively small pale to deep pink flowers on a wiry, zig-zag stem.

Description
The lobe on the top of the anther is short, erect, yellow and tapered. The side lobes are narrow, yellow and have blunt teeth on the tip. The flowers open on humid, sunny days and are sometimes self-pollinating. Flowering occurs from September to November.

Taxonomy and naming
Thelymitra carnea was first formally described in 1810 by Robert Brown and the description was published in his book Prodromus Florae Novae Hollandiae et Insulae Van Diemen. The specific epithet (carnea) is a Latin word meaning "of flesh" or "fleshy".

Distribution and habitat
The tiny sun orchid is widespread and common, usually growing in moist places with low shrubs, grasses and sedges but sometimes in drier habitats in open forest. It is found on the coast and tablelands of New South Wales, in all but the north-west of Victoria, in south-eastern Queensland, in Tasmania and on both the North and South Islands of New Zealand.

References

External links
 
 

carnea
Endemic orchids of Australia
Orchids of New South Wales
Orchids of the Australian Capital Territory
Orchids of Victoria (Australia)
Orchids of Queensland
Orchids of South Australia
Orchids of Tasmania
Orchids of New Zealand
Plants described in 1810